Ruthwell railway station was a railway station in Dumfries and Galloway south of Dumfries, serving the village of Ruthwell with its famous 8th century carved cross; a rural community within the Parish of Ruthwell, lying a half-mile (1 km) north of Clarencefield and  south southwest of Carrutherstown.

History 

The station opened in 1848. The station is now closed, although the line running through the station remains open. The station building has been converted into a private dwelling.

Ruthwell was opened by the Glasgow, Dumfries and Carlisle Railway, which then became part of the Glasgow and South Western Railway; in 1923 it became part of the London Midland and Scottish Railway at the Grouping, passing on to the Scottish Region of British Railways following the 1948 nationalisation of the railways. It was closed by the British Railways Board. The station lay 90.9 miles south of Glasgow St Enoch.

George MacDonald was station master at Ruthwell before moving to Moniaive station in the mid-1900s.

The National Archives of Scotland hold a full collection of plans for the station of various dates.

A hamlet called 'Ruthwell Station' grew' up around the former station, previously known as Plans.

Services

References

External links
 Railscot website
 Railscot Intranet

Railway stations in Great Britain opened in 1848
Railway stations in Great Britain closed in 1965
Beeching closures in Scotland
Former Glasgow and South Western Railway stations
Disused railway stations in Dumfries and Galloway
1848 establishments in Scotland
1965 disestablishments in Scotland